Opportunity is a 1918 American silent comedy-drama film, directed by John H. Collins. It stars Viola Dana, Hale Hamilton, and Frank Currier, and was released on July 1, 1918.

Cast list
 Viola Dana as Mary Willard
 Hale Hamilton as Anthony Fry
 Frank Currier as Henry Clay Willard
 Edward Abeles as Johnson Bowler
 Sally Crute as Beatrice Bowler
 Joseph Burke as Robert Hitchins
 Francis D. Lyon as Wilkins
 Elsie MacLeod as Felice

References

External links 
 
 
 

Metro Pictures films
American silent feature films
American black-and-white films
1910s English-language films
1918 comedy-drama films
Films directed by John H. Collins
1918 films
1910s American films
Silent American comedy-drama films